God's Country: George Jones and Friends is a tribute album to American country music artist George Jones. Released on October 17, 2006 on the Category 5 Records label. It features several of Jones' most well-known songs, such as "White Lightnin'," and "He Stopped Loving Her Today". Various artists contributed cover versions to the album, including Vince Gill, Tanya Tucker and Sammy Kershaw. Jones also appears on this album singing the title track "God's Country", his first brand new song in five years. The album includes a behind-the-scenes DVD of its making. George Jones appears on the album courtesy of Bandit Records.

Track listing

Disc 1 (CD)

Disc 2 (DVD)
 The Making of the Album Documentary [DVD]

Personnel
 Eddie Bayers – Drums
 Mike Brignardello – Bass
 Bob Bullock – Engineer
 Joe Chemay – Bass
 Lisa Cochran – Background Vocals 
 J. T. Corenflos – Electric guitar
 Bill Decker – Mixing
 Joe Diffie – Background Vocals
 Dan Dugmore – Steel Guitar
 Stuart Duncan – Fiddle
 Buddy Emmons – Steel Guitar
 Brandon Epps – Assistant Engineer
 Larry Franklin – Fiddle
 Paul Franklin – Steel Guitar 
 Derek Garten – Assistant Engineer
 Tony Harrell – Piano
 Aubrey Haynie – Fiddle
 Wes Hightower – Background Vocals
 John Hobbs – Piano
 Jim Hoke – Acoustic guitar, Harmonica
 John Jarvis – Piano
 Troy Lancaster – Electric guitar
 Chris Leuzinger – Electric guitar
 B. James Lowry – Acoustic guitar
 Liana Manis – Background Vocals
 Sam Martin – Assistant Engineer
 Brent Mason – Electric guitar
 Andrew Mendelson – Mastering
 Mark Miller – Engineer
 Greg Morrow – Drums
 Gordon Mote – Piano
 Steve Nathan – Strings
 Denny Purcell – Mastering
 Allen Reynolds – Producer
 Michael Rhodes – Bass
 John Wesley Ryles – Background Vocals
 Hank Singer – Fiddle
 Brian Sutton – Acoustic guitar
 Pam Tillis – Background Vocals
 Wanda Vick – Dobro
 Billy Joe Walker Jr. – Producer, Gut String Guitar
 Ginny Johnson Walker – Production Assistant
 Lonnie Wilson – Drums
 Glenn Worf – Bass

Chart performance

2006 compilation albums
2006 video albums
George Jones compilation albums
George Jones tribute albums
Category 5 Records albums
Albums produced by Allen Reynolds
Albums produced by Billy Joe Walker Jr.